Altenheim is a commune in the Bas-Rhin department in the Grand Est region of north-eastern France. It should not be confused with the German village of the same name, part of the municipality Neuried in the state of Baden-Württemberg.

The inhabitants of the commune are known as Altenheimois or Altenheimoises.

Geography
Altenheim is located some 10 km east by south-east of Saverne and 30 km north-west of Strasbourg. It can be accessed from five directions: from Furchhausen in the west by road D230, from Dettwiller in the north by road D112, from Littenheim in the east by road D151, from Saessolsheim in the south-east by road D230, and from Wolschheim in the south by road D112.  All these roads intersect in the village.  The commune consists entirely of farmland other than the village. The only waterway in the commune is the Drusenbach crossing the south-western corner and two small tributaries of this stream in the north of the commune.

Neighbouring communes and villages

History
On 21 January 1945, an American B-17 bomber, the "Princess Pat" was hit by flak returning from a mission to Heilbronn and landed on its belly near the D230 road between Altenheim and Furchhausen.

Heraldry

Administration

List of Successive Mayors of Altenheim

Demography
In 2017, the commune had 212 inhabitants.

Culture and heritage

Civil heritage
The commune has a large number of buildings and structures that are registered as historical monuments:
A House (4) (1837)
A House (5)
A House (7) (1825)
A House (8)
A House (11) (1716)
A House (24) (1716)
A House (33) (1732)
A House (43) (1716)
A Napoleonic Banc-Reposoir (1854)
The Village (Prehistory to 8th century)
Houses (18th-19th century)

Religious heritage
The commune has several religious buildings and structures that are registered as historical monuments:
A Wayside Cross at R.D. 112 (1698)
A Wayside Cross at R.D. 112 / R.D. 151 (1824)
A Wayside Cross at R.D. 112 (north) (19th century)
A Wayside Cross at R.D. 112 (south) (1870)
A Wayside Cross at R.D. 230 (1692)
A Wayside Cross at R.D. 230 (1742)
A Wayside Cross at R.D. 230 (1698)
The Chapel of la-Fête-Dieu (19th century)
The Church of Saint Lambert (18th century). The Church contains many items that are registered as historical objects:
A Funeral Monument of Marie-rose Schmitt and family (1829)
A Funeral Monument of Maria Diss and Jean-Michel Klein (1824)
A Funeral Monument of Marie-Odile Debs (1837)
A Funeral Monument (19th century)
A Chalice with Paten (19th century)
A Statue: Saint Lambert (18th century)
A Neo-Gothic Chalice (19th century)
A Cross: Christ on the Cross
2 Confessionals (18th century)
A Baptismal font (1690)
A Tabernacle (18th century)
A Monumental Cross (1861)
A Cemetery Cross (1882)

Altenheim Picture Gallery

See also 
 Communes of the Bas-Rhin department

References

External links
Altenheim on the old IGN website 
Altenheim on Géoportail, National Geographic Institute (IGN) website 
Altenheim on the 1750 Cassini Map

Communes of Bas-Rhin